The Polizia di Stato (State Police or P.S.) is one of the national police forces of Italy.

Alongside the Carabinieri, it is the main police force for providing police duties, primarily to cities and large towns, and with its child agencies it is also responsible for highway patrol (autostrade), railways (ferrovie), airports (aeroporti), customs (together with the Guardia di Finanza) as well as certain waterways, and assisting the local police forces.

It was a military force until 1981 when the Italian State Law 121 was passed. This converted the State Police to a civil force, which is in contrast to the other main police forces of Italy: the Arma dei Carabinieri, which is a military police (gendarmerie) force and the Guardia di Finanza, the Italian customs and border protection police that also falls in the military corps category.

The Polizia di Stato is the principal Italian police force for the maintenance of public security and as such it is run directly from the Dipartimento della Pubblica Sicurezza (Department of Public Security), and the keeping of public order (ordine pubblico). Interpol summarizes the primary focus of this force: "Its responsibilities include investigative and law enforcement duties, and the security of motorway, railway, and waterway networks".

History 

While the modern Polizia di Stato was created in 1981 with the merger of the many civil police services of Italy, its roots date back to 1852 as the police force of the then Kingdom of Sardinia.

It is successor and heir to the traditions of military and civil police organizations under both monarchy and republic.

Before unification 
On 11 July 1852, the King of Sardinia Victor Emmanuel II established the Public Security Guards, a prototype city police service created to serve Turin and Genoa for the protection of their citizens (Law no.1404), and also formed detachments of municipal police. This date is marked as the official anniversary of the State Police.

At that time there were a number of provincial National Guard and Municipal Militia battalions, plus cavalry platoons detached from the army and Carabinieri.

Unified Italy 
In 1859, given the current situation in regards to the Unification of Italy, the Public Security Guards became the national civil police defacto of a unified Italian nation. Law 3570 (13 November 1859) officially introduced police inspectors into the growing force, and to ensure the security of the residents of a number of provincial capitals and other major cities, the questori, appointed by the leadership with Royal assent, were also introduced becoming the police chiefs of these areas.

On 9 October 1861, the General Directorate of Public Security of the Kingdom was formally established (Royal Decree 225) to serve as the central authority for civilian law enforcement.

Mission 
Europol (the EU's law enforcement agency), provides this summary of the force's responsibilities: "protecting the state, safeguarding the rights and freedoms of citizens, supervising the maintenance of public order, maintaining public safety, providing assistance to public entities and private in the event of accidents and disasters as well as the peaceful resolution of disputes between private individuals. It also deals with the training and education, at its facilities, of members of other police bodies... speciality departments include the Traffic, Railway, Communications Police, the Mobile Departments and the Scientific Police".

Strength 
The State Police has an authorised strength by law of 115,000 people. However, there are approximately 110,000 people of which 16,000 are women. Just under 6,000 employees are civilian support personnel with technical skills who provide logistic and technical support. In 2005 the State Police contained 105,324 members as follows: 893 dirigenti (leaders/officers), 1,839 vice questori (Vice-Questors), 723 commissari capo (Chief Superintendents), 19,230 ispettori (Inspectors), 666 vice ispettori (Sub-inspectors), 13,677 sovrintendenti (Sergeants), 38,976 assistenti (Senior agents), and 29,320 agenti (Constables/Agents).

Approximately 1,500 officers are assigned to the "neighbourhood police" service, the Polizia di Quartiere, which has a police presence on the streets and deters crime. Pairs of poliziotti (policemen) patrol areas of major cities on foot.

Organization 
The headquarters of the Polizia di Stato are in Rome and its chief is referred to as the Capo della Polizia (Chief of the Police) with official Rank of Capo della Polizia – Direttore Generale della Pubblica Sicurezza (Chief of the Police – Director General of Public Security). The Chief of the State Police is also the Honorary President of the National Association of State Police (Associazione Nazionale della Polizia di Stato). Three vice chiefs/directors-general report to the chief and their main functions are:
 accomplishment of the functions
 planning and coordination activity
 Director of the Criminal Investigation Police

The force is organized on a regional and provincial basis. The territory of the Italian Republic is divided into 20 regions. They include 107 provincial commands – one each in the 14 metropolitan cities (città metropolitane), 80 provinces (province), 6 free municipal consortiums (liberi consorzi comunali, the formal provinces of Sicily), 4 abolished Friuli-Venezia Giulia provinces, 2 autonomous provinces – Bolzano – Alto Adige and Trento and 1 in Valle d'Aosta, which is an autonomous region with no provinces nor akin administrative subdivision at all. The administrative centre of each provincial command is the local headquarters, called Questura which is commanded by a Questore (that is also the highest State Police authority for the province – Autorità Provinciale di Pubblica Sicurezza – Provincial Authority of Public Security). The only exceptions are the 2 recently created provinces (Barletta-Andria-Trani (established by law in 2004, operational since 2009) and South Sardinia (established in and operational since 2016). The territory of each province is further divided into Public Security Offices (Commissariati di Pubblica Sicurezza), commanded by a Vice Questore Aggiunto or Commissario Capo (Chief Commissioner). The lowest public security authority is the police station or precinct (Stazione di polizia).

Headquarters organization

Main Offices, Divisions and Specialties of the State Police (Uffici, Reparti e Specialità della Polizia di Stato):

 State Police Band (Banda Musicale della Polizia di Stato)
 Data processing and computer center (Centro Elaborazione Dati)
 Interregional and Regional Collection Centers (Centri Raccolta Ragionale ed Interregionale)
 Central Directorate for the Criminal Police (Direzione centrale della polizia criminale)
 Central Anticrime Directorate (Direzione centrale anticrimine)
 Central Directorate for the Anti-Terrorism Police (Direzione centrale della polizia di prevenzione)
 Central Direction for the Instruction Institutes (Direzione Centrale per gli Istituti d'Istruzione)
 General Inspectorate of Public Security for Civil Aviation and Ministry of Transportation (Ispettorato Generale di Pubblica Sicurezza preso il Ministero dei Trasporti e dell'Aviazione Civile)
 General Inspectorate of Public Security for Ministry of the Economic Development (Ispettorato Generale di Pubblica Sicurezza preso il Ministero dello Sviluppo Economico)
 General Inspectorate of Public Security for Ministry of Labor and the Social Politics (Ispettorato Generale di Pubblica Sicurezza presso il Ministero del Lavoro e delle Politiche Sociali)
 General Inspectorate of Public Security for Palace of the Viminale (Ispettorato Generale di Pubblica Sicurezza presso il Palazzo del Viminale) The Viminale is the headquarters of the Italian Ministry of Interior;
 General Inspectorate of Public Security for the Senate of the Republic (Ispettorato Generale di Pubblica Sicurezza presso il Senato della Repubblica)
 General Inspectorate of Public Security for the Chamber of the Deputies (Ispettorato Generale di Pubblica Sicurezza presso la Camera dei Deputati)
 General Inspectorate of Public Security for the Vatican City (Ispettorato Generale di Pubblica Sicurezza presso la Città del Vaticano)
 General Inspectorate of Public Security for the Presidency of the Council of Ministers (Ispettorato Generale di Pubblica Sicurezza presso la Presidenza del Consiglio dei Ministri)
 General Inspectorate of Public Security for the Presidency of the Republic (Ispettorato Generale di Pubblica Sicurezza presso la Presidenza della Repubblica)
 Central Operational Core of Security (Nucleo Operativo Centrale di Sicurezza – N.O.C.S.)
 Gaming and Betting police (Polizia dei Giochi e delle Scommesse)
 Alpine Aid (Soccorso Alpino)
 Postal and Communications Police (Polizia Postale e delle Comunicazioni)
 Immigration and Border Police (Polizia dell'Immigrazione e delle Frontiere)
 Air Border Police (Polizia di Frontiera Aerea)
 Maritime Police (Polizia Marittima)
 Railway Police (Polizia Ferroviaria)
 Scientific Police (Polizia Scientifica)
 Highway Police (Polizia Stradale)
 Police Mobile Units (Reparti Mobili)
 Mounted Divisions (Reparti a cavallo)
 Artificers Units (Unità Artificieri)
 K-9 Units (Unità Cinofili)
 Superior School of Police (Scuola Superiore di Polizia)
 Police Air Command (Reparti Volo)
 Medical Service (Servizio Sanitario)
 Gold Flames (Fiamme Oro)

Interregional organization
The Interregional Directorates (Direzioni Interregionali), organized since 2007, are:

 Piedmont, Aosta Valley and Liguria (HQ: Turin);
 Lombardy and Emilia-Romagna (HQ: Milan);
 Veneto, Trentino-Alto Adige/Südtirol and Friuli-Venezia Giulia (HQ: Padua);
 Tuscany, Umbria and Marche (HQ: Florence);
 Lazio, Sardinia and Abruzzo (HQ: Rome);
 Campania, Molise, Basilicata and Apulia (HQ: Naples);
 Sicily and Calabria (HQ: Catania).

Questure
There is a Questura in each of the 105 Italian provincial capitals. It is responsible for all the activities carried out by the Polizia di Stato within the province.

Commissariati di Pubblica Sicurezza
In major cities and highly populated towns, there are police stations named Commissariati di Pubblica Sicurezza (Public Security Offices). Each Commissariato di Pubblica Sicurezza is under the Authority of a Questura. Their task is to control, prevent and fight crime in their jurisdiction, and to deal with paperwork as to, among other things, requests for gun licences, passports, permits, and regularization of foreigners.

Polizia di Quartiere is the Quarter Police. Pairs of Poliziotti (Policemen) patrol areas of major cities on foot.

Special operations 
About 24,000 officers, that is almost a quarter of police personnel, work within the Highway Patrol (Polizia Stradale), Railroad Police (Polizia Ferroviaria), Postal and Telecommunications Police (Polizia Postale e delle Telecomunicazioni) and Border and Immigration Police (Polizia di Frontiera).

Highway patrol
 
The Polizia Stradale, or PolStrada for short, is a highway patrol organization. PolStrada police public roads all over the country, including the of motorways (autostrada), the main highways and arterial roads outside towns. Their duties are the prevention and detection of driving offences, car accident reports, planning and carrying out of services to regulate traffic, providing escorts for road safety, protection and control of the road network, rescue operations and cooperation in the collection of traffic flow data.

Railway Police
The Polizia Ferroviaria, or PolFer for short, ensure the security of travellers and their belongings on trains and at stations plus the safety and control of dangerous goods. Railroad Police officers patrol, in particular, long-distance and night trains, and at stations in big cities where vagrants often accumulate. Rete Ferroviaria Italiana and other Ferrovie dello Stato companies co-operate fully with the railroad police in dealing with railway security for passengers.

Post and telecommunications
The Polizia postale e delle comunicazioni, or Polizia Postale for short, investigates all crimes that use communications as part of its modus operandi such as computer hacking, online child pornography, credit card fraud, spreading computer viruses or software copyright violations.

Immigration and Border Police
To control the flow of migrants into Italy, the Department of Public Security set up the Immigration and Border Police Service (Polizia di Frontiera), to enforce regulations concerning the entry and stay of aliens in Italy. The service operates at both central and local level with many land, air and maritime border police offices.

The service is also responsible for passport control, the issuing of residence permits, as well as the prevention and control of illegal immigration. Although due to the Schengen Agreement the land borders have disappeared, the division is still present on all borders to do systematic or random checks. In airports, the border police are in charge of security (hand baggage searches are done by airport companies or private security companies but are supervised by the Polizia di Frontiera and by the Guardia di Finanza) and immigration checks.

Mobile units
There are 13 mobile units of "Reparto Mobile" located in the main Italian cities. These can be deployed throughout the country to maintain public order with crowd-control equipment and vehicles or perform rescue services in areas affected by natural disasters. These units employ personnel that are trained and equipped for their task.

The P.d.S.'s bomb disposal units, mounted detachments, canine units, air support squadrons and maritime and river police units all fall under the mobile unit HQ.

Anti Terrorism Police

The Anti Terrorism Police is a specialist body made up of the Central Directorate for the Anti Terrorism Police and of the Branches for General Investigations and Special Operations Division (DIGOS – Divisione Investigazioni Generali e Operazioni Speciali), located in the questure at the local level. The Directorate for the Anti Terrorism Police has two departments: one is mainly responsible for information collection and analysis while the other develops and coordinates investigations aimed at preventing and fighting terrorism. The Nucleo Operativo Centrale di Sicurezza (Central Operational Core of Security) is the State Police's elite police tactical unit.

Training 
Recruit training is carried out at the police academy and at an advanced school for senior police officers. There are schools for basic training of cadet officers and technical operators, for teaching police specialities, for instructors, pilots, dog handlers and mounted police officers and the community police school.

Weapons 
The standard service pistol of the Polizia di Stato is the Beretta Model 92FS; other sidearms might be made available to police personnel according to necessities and assignments. In addition, a Beretta PM-12S submachine gun is issued to every squad car. Other firearms, such as the Beretta 70/90 assault weapons system, Heckler & Koch MP5 sub-machine guns and Benelli shotguns are in service with the corps and can either be issued to the general personnel according to particular necessities or to the specialities the officers are assigned to. A 40mm grenade launcher, the GL-40/90, manufactured by Luigi Franchi S.p.A. under license from Heckler & Koch of Germany is the standard issue weapon for riot control operations.

Vehicles 

The State Police use Italian vehicles ranging from 1994 Fiat Puntos to the Alfa Romeo 159 2,4 JTD, and the Alfa Romeo 155 8v and foreign makes such as the Subaru Legacy SW and Subaru Forester, BMW E46 and E91, and the Volvo XC70.
The cars are used on the A3 Salerno-Reggio Calabria and the A14 Bologna-Taranto motorways.

On 29 November 2009, one of the two Gallardos was severely damaged in an accident while returning from a public display in Cremona: it crashed into some parked cars while avoiding another car which crossed the road illegally. The Gallardo was fully insured, and is currently being repaired by Lamborghini itself.

On 30 March 2017 the PdS received the second Lamborghini Huracán equipped with V10 engines and 520 bhp in the classic blue-white livery with accessories such as a container for transporting organs and a defibrillator.

Rank structure and insignia

Directors of Police
The directors of police are not sworn police officers, but senior civil servants, and are not uniformed.
  (Chief of Police – Director General of Public Security) is the chief of the Polizia di Stato, and head of the Department of Public Security in the Ministry of Interior and as such in charge of coordinating all Italian police forces.
  (Deputy Chief of Police)
  (Deputy Director General – Director of Central Criminal Police)
  (Deputy Director General), in charge of planning and coordination.

Executive Officers

Director Officers

Inspectors

Superintendent

Agent and Assistant

Decorations awarded to the State Police 
 1 Knight's Cross of the Military Order of Italy
 17 Gold Medals of Civil Valour
 14 Gold Medals of Civil Merit
 3 Silver Medals of Civil Merit
 1 Bronze Medal of Civil Merit
 2 Bronze Medals of Militar Valour
 1 Gold Medal of Public Health Merit
 1 Bronze Medal of Civil Defense Excellence 1st Class
 2 separate Medals of Merited Service in Earthquake Relief (1908 and 1915, respectively)
 UN Peacekeeping Medal (for service as part of UNMIK Kosovo 1995-2004)

See also
Italian Police

References

External links

 Official website
 Official website

 
Italy
National law enforcement agencies of Italy